Pachythyrium is a genus of fungi in the Microthyriaceae family. This is a monotypic genus, containing the single species Pachythyrium parasiticum.

References

External links
Index Fungorum

Microthyriales
Monotypic Dothideomycetes genera